Apilocrocis is a genus of moths of the family Crambidae.

Species
Apilocrocis albicupralis (Hampson, 1918)
Apilocrocis albipunctalis (Hampson, 1918)
Apilocrocis brumalis (Barnes & McDunnough, 1914)
Apilocrocis cephalis (Walker, 1859)
Apilocrocis excelsalis (Schaus, 1912)
Apilocrocis glaucosia (Hampson, 1912)
Apilocrocis novateutonialis Munroe, 1968
Apilocrocis pimalis (Barnes & Benjamin, 1926)
Apilocrocis pseudocephalis Munroe, 1968
Apilocrocis steinbachi Munroe, 1968
Apilocrocis yucatanalis Munroe, 1968

References

Spilomelinae
Crambidae genera
Taxa named by Hans Georg Amsel